Theophilus Fountain Neal  (June 5, 1876 – April 25, 1950), was a Major League Baseball third baseman for the New York Giants. Neal played in four games with the Giants in 1905 and recorded 13 at-bats without getting a hit. He managed in the minor leagues in 1912.

External links

1876 births
1950 deaths
Major League Baseball infielders
Baseball players from Illinois
People from Edgar County, Illinois
New York Giants (NL) players
Minor league baseball managers
Joliet Standards players
Springfield Foot Trackers players
Springfield Hustlers players
Baltimore Orioles (IL) players
Providence Grays (minor league) players
Louisville Colonels (minor league) players
Freeport Pretzels players
Henderson Hens players